Aston is a commune in the Ariège department in the Occitanie region of south-western France.

The inhabitants of the commune are known as Astonnais or Astonnaises.

Geography
Aston is located some 90 km west of Perpignan and 30 km south of Foix. It is located high in the Pyrenees with its southern border the border between France and Andorra. Access to the commune is solely by a local road from Les Cabannes in the north to the village which lies at the northern tip of the commune. The D522 road from Les Cabannes passes down the eastern border of the commune in a tortuous route which terminates at the Angaka ski resort just east of the commune. Except for a very small area around the village the commune is extremely rugged and heavily forested.

The Aston river rises in the south of the commune and flows north, passing through the village, to join the Ariège at Les Cabannes, gathering a very large number of tributaries from all corners of the commune.

Neighbouring communes and villages

Administration

List of Successive Mayors

Demography
In 2017 the commune had 220 inhabitants.

Economy
The commune has two dams for the generation of Hydroelectricity: the Laparan and the Riète. They are operated by Électricité de France.

Sites and monuments
The Étang de Larnoum

See also
Communes of the Ariège department

References

External links
Aston on Géoportail, National Geographic Institute (IGN) website 
Aston on the 1750 Cassini Map

Communes of Ariège (department)